was a Japanese actor, singer, and filmmaker. He is known for starring in the Akumyo series, the Hoodlum Soldier series, and the Zatoichi series.

Life and career
Born Toshio Okumura (奥村 利夫 Okumura Toshio) on 29 November 1931. He was the son of Minoru Okumura (奥村 実), a noted kabuki performer who went by the stage name Katsutōji Kineya (杵屋 勝東治) and who was renowned for his nagauta and shamisen skills, and younger brother of actor Tomisaburo Wakayama.

Shintaro Katsu began his career in entertainment as a shamisen player. He switched to acting because he noticed it was better paid. In the 1960s he starred simultaneously in three long-running series of films, the Akumyo series, the Hoodlum Soldier series, and the Zatoichi series.

He played the role of blind masseur Zatoichi in a series of 25 films between 1962 and 1973, in 100 episodes across a four season television series from 1974 to 1979, and in a 26th and final film in 1989, which he also directed.

In 1967, Katsu formed the company Katsu Productions.

Katsu had a troubled personal life. A heavy drinker, Katsu had several brushes with the law over drug use as well, including marijuana, opium and cocaine with arrests in 1978, 1990 and 1992.

He had also developed a reputation as a troublemaker on set. When director Akira Kurosawa cast him for the lead role in Kagemusha (1980), Katsu left before the first day of shooting was over. Though accounts differ as to the incident, the most consistent one details Katsu's clash with Kurosawa regarding bringing his own film crew to the set (to film Kurosawa in action for later exhibition to his own acting students). Kurosawa is reputed to have taken great offense at this, resulting in Katsu's termination (he was replaced by Tatsuya Nakadai). In her book, Waiting on the Weather, about her experiences with director Kurosawa, script supervisor Teruyo Nogami chalks the differences between Katsu and Kurosawa up to a personality clash that had unfortunate artistic results.

He was the husband of actress Tamao Nakamura (married in 1962), and father of actor Ryutaro Gan (Gan Ryūtarō).

Stunt actor Yukio Kato was killed on the set of Zatoichi 26 by Katsu's son, who was co-starring, when an actual sword was mistaken for a prop, fatally wounding Kato.

In her book, Geisha, A Life, Kyoto geisha Mineko Iwasaki claimed to have had a long time affair with Katsu, whom she calls by his given name, Toshio. The affair ended in 1976, and eventually the two became good friends until his death.

Katsu produced the manga-based Lone Wolf and Cub (Kozure Okami) series of jidaigeki films starring his brother Tomisaburo Wakayama, two of which were later compiled into the movie Shogun Assassin, as well as co-writing, producing, and acting alongside his brother in the TV jidaigeki series Oshizamurai Kiichihōgan (Mute Samurai) and Tsūkai! Kōchiyama Sōshun.

His other television work includes the police drama Keishi-K (Superintendent K) which he starred in (as Katsutoshi Gatsu), co-wrote, directed, and produced. His daughter, Masami Okumura, co-starred.

His film work includes the Hanzo the Razor series as Detective Itami Hanzo. He was also an accomplished shamisen player, as well as a vocalist, recording several albums in both pop and Enka.

He died of pharyngeal cancer on 21 June 1997.

The character Fujitora in the manga series One Piece is based on him.

Filmography

As actor

As producer

As director

As writer

As himself

References

Bibliography

External links 

 
 

1931 births
1997 deaths
Japanese male film actors
Japanese male television actors
Japanese film directors
Japanese people convicted of drug offenses
Samurai film directors
Deaths from cancer in Japan
Singers from Tokyo
20th-century Japanese male actors
20th-century Japanese male singers
20th-century Japanese singers